Chisnallwood Intermediate is the main Intermediate school in the eastern suburbs of Christchurch, New Zealand.  The school had a student roll of 833 students in 2008, which had shrunk to 631 by 2016. The school was recommended for  closure or merger in the 2013 Christchurch school review commissioned by Education Minister Hekia Parata, but was spared.

References

External links 
 

Intermediate schools in New Zealand
Schools in Christchurch